Harry Melling (June 13, 1945 – May 29, 1999) was the team owner of Melling Racing, which won the 1988 NASCAR Winston Cup Series championship with Bill Elliott.

Background 
Melling graduated from Ferris State University. Melling succeeded his father Benjamin as President of The Melling Tool Company in 1975. Melling Tool is a maker of automotive products. Melling also owned Treetops Sylvan Resort in Gaylord, Michigan, turning a small local ski hill into a national skiing and golfing destination.

NASCAR team owner 

Melling's first involvement in NASCAR began in 1979 as a primary sponsor for Benny Parsons. Melling Racing won the NASCAR Winston Cup points championship with Bill Elliott.

Death 
Melling died of a heart attack at his golf course in Gaylord, Michigan, two weeks before his 54th birthday. At the Michigan race two weeks later, which is usually the team's homecoming, the team raced a red and white Cartoon Network (the sponsor in the 1999 season) with the team's driver Jerry Nadeau. On the decklid, a decal said "To Harry! We miss you". Harry's favorite colors were red and white, and semi-served as a team throwback. His son, Mark ran his team for a few more years.

Awards 
 Posthumously inducted in the Michigan Motor Sports Hall of Fame (2004)
 Melling was named one of NASCAR's "40 most important people in NASCAR history" by Winston Cup Scene, an industry NASCAR magazine, in 1997.

References

External links 
 
 Brief Biography

1945 births
1999 deaths
People from Gaylord, Michigan
NASCAR team owners
Ferris State University alumni
20th-century American businesspeople